The Recapture of Angola, or  Reconquest of Angola, was a military campaign fought between the Portuguese and the Dutch occupiers of Angola. Its most important episode was the siege imposed by the Portuguese on the far larger Dutch garrison of Luanda.

In 1641 Johan Maurits sent an expedition under Admiral Cornelis Jol from Recife in Dutch Brazil to seize the Angolan capital of Luanda. The Dutch were able to easily capture Luanda in August as the Portuguese forces were occupied inland in a campaign against the Kingdom of Kongo. The two countries fought to a stalemate over Angola, until in 1648 the governor of Rio de Janeiro and Angola, Salvador de Sá, reached Luanda and finding the city defended by 1200 Dutch troops, besieged them and regained it for Portugal  exactly seven years after its loss.
When a Dutch force of 300 soldiers returned from the interior to help their garrison of Luanda, they also surrendered to the Portuguese, but their allied warriors of Queen Ndjinga fought a battle against the Portuguese and were defeated as well.
Then Salvador Correia de Sa sent a force to Benguela where the Dutch garrison surrendered.

He also sent a fleet which recaptured the archipelago of São Tomé e Príncipe from the Dutch, who left behind their artillery.

This was a decisive Dutch defeat since Dutch Brazil couldn't survive without the slaves from Angola. The end of Dutch presence in South America (with the exception of the Guiana) meant not only the bankruptcy of the WIC, but also the end of most of the West Dutch empire.

Notes

References

Lourenço, Paula.Battles of Portuguese History - Defence of the Overseas. - Volume X. (2006)

Angola
Angola
Angola
1648 in Africa
Angola
Angola–Portugal relations
Angola–Netherlands relations
History of Luanda
Battles in Angola
1648 in the Dutch Empire
1648 in the Portuguese Empire